Climate emergency declarations have been made by multiple jurisdictions in the United Kingdom, including city, county, and borough councils. Bills to declare a climate emergency have also been introduced in several other jurisdictions.

National 
Several bills have been introduced to the Parliament of the United Kingdom which would declare a climate emergency, but none have passed.

The Climate and Ecological Emergency Bill was tabled as an early day motion on 2 September 2020 and received its first reading the same day.

Devolved jurisdictions

Local

England

County councils

District councils

London boroughs 
There are thirty three London borough authorities, there are only five of these London Borough authorities that have not declared a climate emergency. This means that 85% of London Boroughs have declared a climate emergency. The below table contains data of climate emergency declarations that has been obtained through CEDAMIA and edited to include jurisdictions that have not declared a climate emergency.

Metropolitan districts

Unitary authorities

Northern Ireland

Scotland

Wales

References

Climate change policy in the United Kingdom